The UWA World Middleweight Championship (Campeonato Mundial de Peso Medio UWA in Spanish) is a professional wrestling championship originally created and sanctioned by the Mexican lucha libre promotion Universal Wrestling Association (UWA) from 1976 until the UWA closed in 1995. Upon the closing of the UWA, the title migrated to Japan's Michinoku Pro Wrestling and Toryumon Japan promotions. Currently, the title resides in Kaientai Dojo, where it is held by Kyu Mogami.

As it was a professional wrestling championship, the championship was not won not by actual competition, but by a scripted ending to a match determined by the bookers and match makers. On occasion the promotion declares a championship vacant, which means there is no champion at that point in time. This can either be due to a storyline, or real life issues such as a champion suffering an injury being unable to defend the championship, or leaving the company.

Title history

Combined reigns 

{| class="wikitable sortable" style="text-align: center"
!Rank
!Wrestler
!No. ofreigns
!Combineddays
|-
!1
| style="background-color:#FFE6BD"| Kyu Mogami † || 1 || +
|-
!2
| Valente Fernández || 1 || 
|-
|-
!3
| Negro Casas || 1 || 787
|-
!4
| Kaji Tomato || 5 || 783
|-
!5
| Gran Hamada || 3 || 712
|-
!6
| Yoshihiro Asai/Último Dragón || 5 || 701
|-
!7
| Jungla Negra || 1 || 700
|-
!8
| Boso Boy Raito || 2 || 692
|-
!9
| Makoto Oishi || 4 || 669
|-
!10
| Shiori Asahi || 3 || 632
|-
!11
| Centurión Negro || 2 || 609
|-
!12
| Rene Guajardo || 2 || 515
|-
!13
| Ayumu Honda || 1 || 497
|-
!14
| Aníbal || 1 || 476
|-
!15
| Yasu Urano || 2 || 417
|-
!16
| Yuki Sato || 2 || 406
|-
!17
| Minoru Tanaka || 1 || 330
|-
!18
| PSYCHO || 2 || 311
|-
!19
|  || 1 || 268
|-
!20
| Cuchillo || 2 || 228
|-
!21
| Taka Michinoku || 2 || 203
|-
!22
| Hi69 || 1 || 188
|-
!23
| Men's Teioh || 2 || 186
|-
!24
| Mr. X3/Silver Wolf || 2 ||style="background-color:#bbeeff"| 183¤
|-
!25
| Tiger Mask || 1 || 155
|-
!26
| Quiet Storm || 1 || 147
|-
!27
| Hiro Tonai || 1 || 141
|-
!28
| Kōji Ishinriki || 1 || 139
|-
!29
| Cachorro Mendoza || 1 || 134
|-
!rowspan=3|30
| Daigoro Kashiwa || 1 || 133
|-
| Luis Arizona || 1 || 133
|-
| Masmune || 1 || 133
|-
!33
| Super Astro || 2 || 132
|-
!34
| Ryuichi Sekine || 1 || 119
|-
!35
| Onryo || 1 || 105
|-
!36
| Shoichi Funaki || 1 || 66
|-
!37
| Shinobu || 1 || 58
|-
!38
| Fuminori Abe || 1 || 49
|-
!39
| GENTARO || 1 || 7
|-
!40
|  || 1 || 4
|-
!41
| Masayoshi Motegi || 1 || <1
|-
!rowspan=4|42
| || 1 ||style="background-color:#bbeeff"| N/A¤
|-
|  || 1 ||style="background-color:#bbeeff"| N/A¤
|-
| || 1 ||style="background-color:#bbeeff"| N/A¤
|-
|  || 1 ||style="background-color:#bbeeff"| N/A¤

Footnotes

References

External links
UWA World Middleweight Title

Active Advance Pro Wrestling championships
Universal Wrestling Association championships
Middleweight wrestling championships
World professional wrestling championships
Battlarts championships
Michinoku Pro Wrestling championships